Cumberland Caverns is a national natural landmark and show cave located in McMinnville, Tennessee. It is the second longest cave in Tennessee and makes the list of longest caves in the United States and in the world.

History
The main entrance was discovered by Aaron Higgenbotham in 1810 while he was surveying the nearby Chickamauga Trail on Cardwell Mountain in what is now Warren County.  According to legend, Higgenbotham was the first man to enter the cave and it was named Higgenbotham Cave in his honor.  Another smaller cave, also located on Cardwell Mountain, was also discovered about this time and was named Henshaw Cave.  Although not nearly as big as Higgenbotham Cave, Henshaw Cave proved to be a source of saltpeter (the main ingredient of gunpowder) and was operated as a saltpeter mine during perhaps both the War of 1812 and the Civil War.

Higgenbotham Cave became a favorite spot for local adventurers during the 19th century and groups would ride out to the entrance in hay wagons and make the strenuous trip to a point in the cave now known as the Ten Acre Room. In the days of the hay wagon parties, it was called the Big Room. Here, many visitors left their names and the date candled on the ceiling.

In the early 1940s, members of the National Speleological Society (NSS) began to explore Higgenbotham Cave. Within a decade, they had greatly increased the known extent of the cave.  In 1953 a connection was discovered between Henshaw Cave and Higgenbotham Cave.  This connection was named the Meatgrinder because of its small size and shape.  Soon afterwards, some of these explorers leased the cave from its owner, Mr. Andy Powell, and developed it into a commercial cave.  The cave opened under the name Cumberland Caverns on July 4, 1956 and has been open to the public since that time.

A portion of the Trail of Tears passes through Cumberland Caverns property. A walking trail is open to the public.

Commerce
The Cumberland Caverns company offers year-round commercial tours of the cave, claiming it is the largest show cave in Tennessee. Tours include a daytime walking tour, spelunking tours, overnight tours, and educational field trips. Weddings, banquets, and birthday parties are also hosted. Before reaching the cave, tourists pass through a gift shop that sells tour tickets, souvenirs, and novelty items.

Cumberland Caverns Live

Cumberland Caverns was formerly home to Bluegrass Underground, a monthly music event that took place in the cave's Volcano Room. The event has become a nationally syndicated program airing on PBS.

Now, the Volcano Room is home to Cumberland Caverns Live and hosts a variety of concerts and live music, including acts like Sister Hazel, Kip Moore, and Deer Tick (band).

Geology
Cumberland Caverns formed in Mississippian Monteagle limestone on the western escarpment of the Cumberland Plateau. The cave is home to stalagmites, stalactites, helictites, flowstone, cave pearls, botryoidal coral, gypsum flowers, needles, and pure white gypsum snow, as well as a variety of cave life.

Formations of interest within the cavern include:
 the "Volcano Room," where many of the cave's commercial events are hosted.
 "Monument Pillar," a large flowstone formation.
 "Crystal Palace," which contains crystals and gypsum flowers.
 three spelunking tunnels known as "the Dragon's Back" due to their winding spine-like walkways.
 the "Lemon Squeeze," so named because its widest point is only .
 "Bubblegum Alley," a passageway similar in size to the Lemon Squeezer but with damper ground that makes it sticky.
 "Ball's Pit," named for Donald Ball, who died from falling into the pit in the 1950's.

Popular culture
The 1985 movie What Waits Below was filmed in Cumberland Caverns.

A Children's Education DVD by singer/songwriter Buddy Davis "Amazing Adventures: Extreme Caving" was filmed in Cumberland Caverns

References

External links

Cumberland Caverns Official Site
Bluegrass Underground Official Site

Caves of Tennessee
Landforms of Warren County, Tennessee
Music venues in Tennessee
Show caves in the United States
Tourist attractions in Warren County, Tennessee
National Natural Landmarks in Tennessee
Mines in Tennessee